Weld-On is a division of IPS Corporation, a manufacturer of solvent cements, primers, and cleaners for PVC, CPVC, and ABS plastic piping systems. Weld-On products are commonly used for joining plastic pipes and fittings. Weld-On also manufactures specialty products from repair adhesives for leaking pipes, pipe thread sealants / joint compounds, to test plugs for pipeline pressure testing. Their products are most commonly utilized in the irrigation, industrial, pool & spa, electrical conduit, and plumbing industries.

Headquartered in California, Weld-On has operations throughout the United States, as well as in China, and a worldwide network of sales representatives and distributors.

History 
1954: Weld-On founded and established as a division of IPS Corporation.
1955: Weld-On developed the first clear, reactive acrylic adhesive that met U.S. Department of Defense military specification (MIL-SPEC) for use on aircraft canopies
1958: IPS Corporation began endorsing the solvent welding technique, a type of plastic welding, and patented Weld-On solvent cement for use on plastic pipe and fittings.
1978: Weld-On developed and released color-match acrylic adhesive for bonding solid surface countertops.
1992: Weld-On formulated and introduced the first low volatile organic compound (VOC) emission solvent cement in response to growing air quality concerns.
1997: Weld-On 724 was introduced as the first high-strength solvent cement for chemical resistant CPVC plastic joints in the market and formulated for use in a variety of harsh chemical applications such as hypochlorites, acids and caustics. 
1999: Weld-On began offering environmentally-responsible, all low-VOC solvent cements, primers and cleaners, and began phasing out regular VOC products.

References

Cement
Piping
Plumbing
Manufacturing companies based in California
American companies established in 1954
Manufacturing companies established in 1954
Companies based in Los Angeles County, California
Compton, California